Salix denticulata is a species of shrub or small tree in the family Salicaceae. It is a mountain species endemic to the Himalayan region.

Description
The shoots are downy when young. Like all willows this species is dioecious. The flowers bloom in April and May.

Distribution
Salix denticulata is native to the mountainous regions of central Asia, being present in Afghanistan, Pakistan,  Nepal, India and the Chinese provinces of Sichuan, Tibet and Yunnan.

References

denticulata